This is a list of Bien de Interés Cultural landmarks in the Province of Castellón, Spain.

List 
 Carabona Tower
 Castillo o Torre
 El Fadrí
 Peniscola Castle
 Segorbe Cathedral

References 
Sección 1ª. Bienes de interés cultural. Generalitat Valenciana. (Select Província as "Castelló" and click "Cercar"). Access date 2018-05-16. 

 
Castellon